Croatia competed at the 1992 Summer Paralympics in Barcelona, Spain. 6 competitors from Croatia won a single bronze medal, finishing joint 50th in the medal table with 5 other countries.

See also 
 Croatia at the Paralympics
 Croatia at the 1992 Summer Olympics

References 

1992
1992 in Croatian sport
Nations at the 1992 Summer Paralympics